also known by his Chinese style name , was a bureaucrat of the Ryukyu Kingdom.

Goeku was born to an aristocrat family called Shō-uji Wakugawa Dunchi, later became the eighth head of this family. He was also a descendant of King Shō Sen'i.

King Shō Tei dispatched a gratitude envoy for his accession to Edo, Japan in 1671. They sailed back in the next year.

He served as a member of Sanshikan from 1675 to 1683.

References

1621 births
1695 deaths
Ueekata
Sanshikan
People of the Ryukyu Kingdom
Ryukyuan people
17th-century Ryukyuan people